Sunset at Chaophraya may refer to:
Sunset at Chaophraya (1996 film), a Thai film by Euthana Mukdasanit
Sunset at Chaophraya (2013 film), a 2013 Thai film by Kittikorn Liasirikun

See also 
Khu Kam, a Thai novel written by Thommayanti